Tiempo Pa' Matar (Time To Kill) is Willie Colón's fourth studio album as a soloist. Published by Fania Records in 1983, the album has 8 songs and was the most successful album Colón made for Fania Records, surpassing his previous albums Solo and Fantasmas. The lead single "Tiempo Pa' Matar" was a protest song by Colón against the Vietnam War.

Context 
Tiempo Pa' Matar moved away from the rhythmic sound of Colón's previous albums Fantasmas and Corazón Guerrero. Stylistically Tiempo Pa' Matar fuses the genres of salsa and plena with a flute sound.

Songs

References

Fania Records albums
Willie Colón albums